Libby Hernández (born 22 September 1947) is a Puerto Rican equestrian. She competed in the individual dressage event at the 1984 Summer Olympics.

References

External links
 

1947 births
Living people
Puerto Rican female equestrians
Puerto Rican dressage riders
Olympic equestrians of Puerto Rico
Equestrians at the 1984 Summer Olympics
Place of birth missing (living people)